Henry W. Downs (August 29, 1844 – July 2, 1911) was a Union Army soldier during the American Civil War. He received the Medal of Honor for gallantry during the Battle of Opequon more commonly called the Third Battle of Winchester, Virginia on September 19, 1864. He is buried at Dayton National Cemetery in Dayton, Ohio.

Medal of Honor citation
"The President of the United States of America, in the name of Congress, takes pleasure in presenting the Medal of Honor to Sergeant Henry W. Downs, United States Army, for extraordinary heroism on 19 September 1864, while serving with Company I, 8th Vermont Infantry, in action at Winchester, Virginia. With one comrade, Sergeant Downs voluntarily crossed an open field, exposed to a raking fire, and returned with a supply of ammunition, successfully repeating the attempt a short time thereafter."

See also

List of Medal of Honor recipients
List of American Civil War Medal of Honor recipients: A–F

References

External links
 

1844 births
1911 deaths
People from Jamaica, Vermont
Union Army soldiers
People of Vermont in the American Civil War
United States Army Medal of Honor recipients
American Civil War recipients of the Medal of Honor